François Fournier may refer to:
 François Fournier (Lower Canada politician) (1776–1836), land surveyor and politician in Lower Canada
 François Fournier (French politician) (1866–1941), French politician from Manduel, Gard
 François Fournier (stamp forger) (1846–1917), Swiss-born stamp forger
 François Fournier-Sarlovèze (1773–1827), French general of the Napoleonic Wars
 François Joseph Fournier (1857–1935), Belgian adventurer
 Jean-François Fournier (born 1966), writer, poet and biographer from Saint-Maurice